The Irish Baseball and Softball Federation, also known as Baseball Ireland, is the governing body of baseball and softball on the island of Ireland, covering both Northern Ireland and the Republic of Ireland.

Baseball Ireland is responsible for the national baseball team and overseeing the Irish Baseball League.

History
Baseball Ireland was established in 1989 with the goal of developing and furthering the growth of baseball and softball in Ireland. Organised baseball has been played in Ireland since the late 1990s. In 1995 and 1996, visiting coaches from Major League Baseball provided instruction to senior players and helped to form the first Irish national senior team that played in the 1996 European Championships held in Hull, England.

Teams
Baseball Ireland oversees the development of the following national baseball teams:

Ireland national baseball team
Ireland national under-18 baseball team
Ireland national under-15 baseball team

References

1989 establishments in Ireland
Ireland
Baseball in Ireland
Sports organizations established in 1989
Softball organizations
Baseball
Softball in Ireland